Taylor Inglis (born November 4, 1983) is a former professional Canadian football long snapper who most recently played for the Edmonton Eskimos of the Canadian Football League. He has also played for the Winnipeg Blue Bombers. He played in the CJFL for the Edmonton Wildcats.

He announced his retirement from football on May 10, 2012.

References

1983 births
Living people
Canadian football long snappers
Edmonton Elks players
Players of Canadian football from Alberta
Canadian football people from Edmonton